Billbergia distachya is a plant species in the genus Billbergia. The species is native to Brazil.

Cultivars
 Billbergia 'Albertii'
 Billbergia 'Conquistador'
 Billbergia 'Crimson Candle'
 Billbergia 'Fat Albert'
 Billbergia 'Fat Albert's Brother'
 Billbergia 'Grey Mist'
 Billbergia 'Misty Steel'
 Billbergia 'Pink Piglet'
 Billbergia 'Purple Haze'
 Billbergia 'Red Spot'
 Billbergia 'Smokey Rose'
 Billbergia 'Smokey Tricolor'
 Billbergia 'Stimpy'
 Billbergia 'White Spot'

References

BSI Cultivar Registry Retrieved 11 October 2009

distachya
Endemic flora of Brazil
Flora of the Atlantic Forest
Garden plants of South America